Mahan admitted theUdayana was a king of Vatsa in India, a contemporary of Gautama Buddha.  He is a popular figure in Indian literature, for both his romantic and military stories, but though he probably existed, little is known for certain about his life or reign.  

According to Buddhist sources, the Buddha visited Kauśāmbī several times during the reign of Udayana on his effort to spread the dharma, the Eightfold Path and the Four Noble Truths. Udayana was an Upasaka (lay follower) of Buddha. The Chinese translation of the Buddhist canonical text  states that the first image of Buddha, curved out of sandalwood was made under the instruction of Udayana.

Life
Udayana, the son of Śatānīka II by the Videha princess succeeded him.
Niti Adaval mentions about Udayana and his love for music, art and fondness of women. Due to a dohada ("pregnancy craving"), Mṛgāvatī, pregnant with Udayana, is either covered or immersed in red. A monstrous bird mistakes her for raw meat and carries her away, later dropping her. She is cared for in a hermitage, where she raises her son. Udayana obtains a wonderful lute, elephant taming skills, and confidants; he and his mother eventually return to their home, Kauśāmbī.

Udayana is later captured by Pradyota, the King of Ujjayinī. Here, he teaches the lute to Pradyota's daughter, Vāsavadattā, and they fall in love. Eventually they escape to Kauśāmbī, where Udayana's rightful kingship is restored, and they are married. But fearing Udayana is getting soft, and desiring an additional political alliance, Udayana's ministers make him believe that Vāsavadattā is dead, and effect his marriage to Padmāvati.

Though he is later reunited with Vāsavadattā, Udayana remains childless. Later, as a boon of Kubera, Vāsavadattā becomes pregnant with Naravāhanadatta (his name means "given by Kubera"), who is fated to become the emperor of the Vidyādharas.

Accounts 
The  contains a long account of his conquests. The  refers to a peasant girl  who became his wife. The  of  mentions about another queen named , a sister of king  of Magadha. The name of his son by his chief queen is Bodhi.

References

Citations

Sources
 
 

6th-century BC Indian monarchs